DAGEN (commonly written Dagen) was a Danish newspaper which published for only 41 issues, from 22 October 2002 to 6 December 2002. DAGEN was the first new newspaper in almost 50 years in Denmark.

History and profile
On 6 December 2002, Dagen had a debt of 34.9 million DKK, and bankruptcy was declared on 13 December 2002.

Peter Linck was the creator of the newspaper, and the editor was Kresten Schultz Jørgensen.

The newspaper had more media coverage than it itself was able to cover about its bankruptcy.  The coverage from other media was intense.  Many used the newspaper's own mottos for jokes about its bankruptcy, a famous one was "til folk som kan læse, fra folk som ikke kan regne"  (Danish: "for people who can read, from people who can't count") as a reference to the overwhelming bankruptcy it suffered.

Mottos 
DAGEN had a few mottos, in order to draw distance from other current newspapers.
 Til folk som kan læse, fra folk der kan skrive (Danish: to people who can read, from people who can write).
 Hverken venstreorienteret eller højreorienteret, men velorienteret (Danish: not left-wing nor right-wing, but well present)

See also
 List of newspapers in Denmark

References

External links  
  DAGEN's own website
  Peter Linck-effekten
  "Ingen kender DAGEN" - en håndsyet italiensk sandals turbulente liv
  En moderne Avis-mission
  

2002 establishments in Denmark
2002 disestablishments in Denmark
Newspapers established in 2002
Publications disestablished in 2002
Defunct newspapers published in Denmark
Daily newspapers published in Denmark
Danish-language newspapers
Newspapers published in Copenhagen